The Trilogy (1884-1888) is a series of three novels written by the Polish author Henryk Sienkiewicz.  The series follows dramatized versions of famous events in Polish history, weaving fact and fiction. It is considered great literary work on par with Adam Mickiewicz's Pan Tadeusz.

The first novel, titled With Fire and Sword, chronicles the mid-17th century Ukrainian Cossacks revolt in Polish–Lithuanian Commonwealth known as the Khmelnytsky Uprising.

The second book, The Deluge, describes the Swedish invasion of Poland in the mid 17th century known as The Deluge, which followed the Khmelnytsky Uprising.

The final novel, Fire in the Steppe (title of the original: Pan Wołodyjowski, lit. Sir Wołodyjowski), follows wars between Poland and the Ottoman Empire in the late 17th century.

The trilogy was written by Sienkiewicz at a time when the Polish state—after being partitioned between Russian, Austrian and German empires at the end of the 18th century—did not exist, and the majority of Poles were living in the Russian occupation zone named Vistula Land, formerly Congress Poland. One of Sienkiewicz's goals in writing The Trilogy was to encourage and strengthen Polish national confidence against the occupying powers. 

In order to circumvent the Russian censorship, he chose to place the plot at times and places when the Poles were fighting against enemies other than Russia.

External links
Illustrations for The Trilogy by Juliusz Kossak (second part)

 
Novels by Henryk Sienkiewicz
Literary trilogies
Novel series
Epic novels
1880s novels